4-Hydroxy-2-oxoglutarate aldolase, mitochondrial (HOGA1) also known as dihydrodipicolinate synthase-like (DHDPSL) is an enzyme that in humans is encoded by the HOGA1 gene. The protein is one of the enzymes (4-hydroxy-2-oxoglutarate aldolase) involved in metabolism of hydroxyproline to glyoxylate. The enzyme  overactivity can form excessive glyoxylate from hydroxyproline. Glyoxylate is catabolised to oxalate, resulting in excess excretion of oxalate in urine, predisposing to oxalate stone; a condition known as primary hyperoxaluria type III.

References